The 1956 VFL Night Premiership Cup was the Victorian Football League end of season cup competition played between the eight teams that didn't make the finals of that season. It was held between 23 August to 17 September 1956 with games being played at the Lake Oval, home ground of South Melbourne as it was the only ground equipped to host night games.

Eight teams played in the first competition with the final seeing an attendance of 32,450 as  defeated  in the final by 6 points (13.16.94 to 13.10.88).

Games

Quarterfinals

Semifinals
The semi-finals began on the 6 September with South Melbourne taking on North Melbourne. In another tight tussle between the teams, it was not until late on in the final quarter with the usage of the wind that South Melbourne would take the win with a goal from Monks sealing the five point victory. In the second semi-final, an attendance of 25,500 saw Carlton win the match by 12 points in what The Age called fast, rugged and exciting football with Carlton leading at each break to record the victory.

Final
The final of the 1956 edition was played on the 17 September 1956 between South Melbourne and Carlton. With an attendance of 32,450 watching the match, South Melbourne's win was credited in the second quarter when they outscored Carlton 4.2 to 0.3 to open up a thirty-one point lead. Carlton tried to come back into the match throughout the final quarter and had a chance to take the lead but a dropped pass from Hands would give South Melbourne the win by six points and become the first winners of the Night Series Cup.

See also
List of Australian Football League night premiers
1956 VFL season

References